Crash Boom Bang!, known in Japan as Crash Bandicoot Festival, is a party game developed by Dimps and published by Vivendi Universal Games for the Nintendo DS. It was released in Japan on July 20, 2006, in North America on October 10, 2006, in Europe on October 27, 2006, and in Australia on November 2, 2006. It is the first game in the Crash Bandicoot series to be developed by a Japanese company and the first to be released in Japan before North America.

Crash Boom Bang! is the first Crash game to be released for the Nintendo DS, and the second party game of the series, after Crash Bash. The game's story centers on a multi-millionaire who uses the characters of the series to unearth a powerful object dubbed the "Super Big Power Crystal". The game was met with largely negative reviews for having unoriginal, dull gameplay and poor controls.

Gameplay 

Crash Boom Bang!'s stages resemble board games, as each play area is split into a number of squares. The game takes place among four players, with the computer assigned to spare players. All players simultaneously roll dice. The number each player rolls is the number of squares they move forward. Depending on the type of square that the player lands on, Wumpa Fruit (which is used as points during the race) can be won or lost, an item can be obtained, a special event might be triggered, or a mini-game might commence. If a player lands on a fork in the road, the player will have to select the desired direction with either the stylus or the control pad.

In the Adventure Mode, the characters compete in a race for the Super Big Power Crystal. This race is made up of six stages, each containing smaller sub-maps. The host of the race, the Viscount, sets a task for each stage. This task must be completed before the player can continue to another map. The player with the most points is the winner of the stage. The overall winner of all the stages is the winner of the Viscount's race. In the Festival Mode, the gameplay is fundamentally the same as in the Adventure Mode, with the exception of the ability to select stages to play freely. In the My Room mode, the player's character has his or her own private room in which the player can play minigames that have been collected in Adventure Mode, view a collection of items obtained in Adventure Mode, or create a Motion Panel, a unique in-game communication tool can allow customized messages to be sent mid-game to help friends or distract other players' gameplay. The decorations in My Room are different for each character.

Crash Boom Bang! features forty mini-games that can be played alone or remotely against friends. Balance, timing, and intelligence are required to win these mini-games. Players not taking part in a mini-game can bet Wumpa Fruit on the winner. Betting players can assist or obstruct players in the mini-game by using the Motion Panel. If a player has a special item, the player can access the Shop screen from the Bet screen and buy or sell items.

Plot

Characters 

A number of characters from past Crash Bandicoot games return in Crash Boom Bang!, though only eight are playable. The playable characters include Crash Bandicoot, Coco Bandicoot, Crunch Bandicoot, Pura, Doctor Neo Cortex, Tawna, Pinstripe Potoroo, and Fake Crash. All of the characters physically appear as they do in official Japanese Crash Bandicoot artwork and promotions (making the game the only Sierra Entertainment entry in the series to use the Japanese artwork and promotions), though Crash's model was altered for the non-Japanese releases to closer resemble his Crash Twinsanity model. The host of the party, the Viscount, is an original character designed specifically for the game. His name in the original Japanese version is "Viscount Devil", a reference to the Tasmanian devil native to Australia. Other past characters make cameos in the game at one point or another, such as the Lab Assistants, Doctor N. Gin, Tiny Tiger, Doctor Nefarious Tropy and Polar. Aku Aku serves as the player's tutor, while Uka Uka makes a cameo appearance as a purchaseable item in the shop.

Story 
While developing a resort in Tasmania, the Viscount finds a map of an ancient city containing the fabled Super Big Power Crystal. He attempts to find it himself, but due to the large amount of puzzles, he fails miserably. In the resort, the Viscount decides to gather up the world's cleverest and strongest bunch of characters and con them into finding the Crystal for him. He sends an invitation to Coco Bandicoot, inviting her and Crash to the World Cannonball Race, where the winner earns $100 million.

The race starts in a Port Town, with the winners traveling in a boat to a large desert. Legend has it that four stone tablets are buried somewhere in the desert, and the contestants are sent out to dig for them and bring them to the Viscount. According to the stone tablets, the actual location of the Crystal is hidden somewhere on the ancient map. Before he can investigate the matter further, Doctor Neo Cortex swoops in and snatches the map. As the two struggle for the map, the map is torn to shreds.

Cortex sends his loyal Lab Assistants to find the pieces of the map scattered throughout the big City and bring them to him. Now that the contestants know about the map, the Viscount decides to reveal his true intentions: the Super Big Power Crystal can grant a single wish who whoever obtains it, and the Viscount is willing to give a large sum of money to those who help him find it. Finding the Power Crystal is impossible without the Final Key, so the Viscount boards his plane to travel to the North Atlantic Ocean in search for the Final Key. But the plane is full, and only a select number of the contestants are able to board. Propelled to the skies by an explosive volcano, the contestants are able to board the Viscount's plane.

On the Viscount's ship, the Viscount tells the group the story of an explorer who found the Final Key, but was unable to find the Power Crystal. That explorer was the Viscount's grandfather. As the explorer sailed back to his homeland to recollect his thoughts, his ship crashed into an iceberg and sank, taking the Viscount's grandfather to a watery grave. "Sounds like a movie", remarks one of the attendees. The Viscount tells them to dive to the sunken ship and retrieve the Final Key, much to their shock, considering the near-freezing temperatures. Despite this, the group is able to find the Final Key before freezing to death. With all the pieces of the puzzle at hand, the Viscount victoriously enters the Tower, where the Super Big Power Crystal awaits its owner. Just as the Viscount is about to make his wish, Crash steps forward and makes his wish of a large pile of Wumpa Fruit, much to the Viscount's grief. "May peace prevail on Earth", says Coco.

Development 
Crash Boom Bang was developed by a Japanese video game studio Dimps. The game was designed by Yuka Niijima, Maiko Azaki and Shiina Suzuki, and was produced by Shinji Yoshikawa of Vivendi Universal Games. Takeshi Narita served as a creative director. It was programmed by Takeshi Kobayashi and Michitoshi Momose, with Kazuteru Suzuki serving as a chief programmer. The music was composed and arranged by Kuniyuki Morohashi. Yutaka Shioya served as the art director for the game.

On developing the mobile phone version of Crash Boom Bang!, producer Elodie Larre described adapting a party game for the mobile phone as a "big challenge". Not wanting to make "another multiplayer game where the players just pass the phone to each other" and hoping to attract both old and new fans of the series, the development team decided to integrate the mobile phone itself into the minigames, creating such minigame gimmicks as playing with one hand behind the back, with one eye closed, playing with the chin, etc. The biggest challenge for the team was keeping the minigames inside the phone's memory, which was cited as slightly inferior to the first PlayStation console. The WarioWare series was described as an influence in making the game.

Crash Boom Bang! is the first game in the series to exclusively feature the Japanese voice cast in all regional versions of the game. The voice cast includes Makoto Ishii in the dual role of Crash and Fake Crash, Risa Tsubaki as Coco, Yōsuke Akimoto as Doctor Cortex, Shinya Fukumatsu as Crunch, Akiko Toda as Tawna, Asuka Tanii as Pura, and Takahiro Yoshino as Pinstripe.

Reception 

Crash Boom Bang! received mostly negative reviews, with the game receiving a score of 37 out of 100 based on fourteen reviews at Metacritic. Frank Provo of GameSpot criticized the game for its dull minigames and purely cosmetic Crash license, citing that "apart from the way the characters look and the way the Nitro boxes explode, [...] there isn't a whole lot that's Crash-like about Crash Boom Bang!". Nintendo Power recommended the game only to die-hard Crash fans and advised others to wait for Crash's next outing. Lesley Smith of Eurogamer criticized the game for a number or reasons, including bad stylus recognition, boring gameplay, terrible graphics and rigged, repetitive mini-games. IGN's review was one of the most scathing, dubbing Crash Boom Bang! "a terrible, terrible game with poor organization" and "easily one of the worst games on the system". More middling reviews have come in from Official Nintendo Magazine, who felt the game was hampered by dodgy controls and a testing user interface, and Pocket Gamer's Jon Jordan, who dismissed the game's collection of minigames as "distinctly average and oddly passionless". Despite the negative reception, Crash Boom Bang! was the seventh best-selling game in Australia on the week of June 4 to June 10, 2007.

References 
 Notes

 Citations

External links 
 

2006 video games
Crash Bandicoot games
Dimps games
Nintendo DS games
Nintendo DS-only games
Party video games
Sierra Entertainment games
Universal Interactive games
Video games developed in Japan
Video games featuring female protagonists
Multiplayer and single-player video games